The middle thyroid vein collects the blood from the lower part of the thyroid gland, and after being joined by some veins from the larynx and trachea, ends in the lower part of the internal jugular vein.

Clinical feature
This vein is subjected for dissection as a part of surgical procedures on the thyroid.

Additional images

References 

Veins of the head and neck